Manevri na petiya etazh (Bulgarian language: Маневри на петия етаж, English language: Maneuvers on the Fifth Floor) is a comedy movie released in Bulgaria in 1985. It was directed by Petar B. Vasilev and written by Chavdar Shinov. It is a nice presentation of the passions and the intrigues developing in a socialist firm in mid-eighties, when it comes to business trips abroad.

Plot

Three colleagues and devoted friends – Danton, Petar and Andrey – share an office and not only on the fifth floor of a socialist industrial research institute from the mid-eighties. Every morning when they come to work they lock the door of the office and, armed with binoculars and great interest, they begin watching the aerobics exercises of a young girl in the nearby building. Suddenly, their tranquil daily round is disturbed - a new director takes over the Institute and decides to develop close scientific partnerships with similar institutes in Japan. A rumor has it that one of our three friends will go on a business trip there. But who? The three friends are now rivals. Homo homini lupus est! All the three undertake sophisticated underground maneuvers in order to get the prize. Everything is at stake! There is only one rule and it is there are NO rules! At the end, of course, it turns out everything has been in vain. The one to go to Japan is the director.Numerous situations filled with humor follow and, at the very end, after the grotesque outcome, we can see the three friends together again. But this time, much wiser… perhaps.

Cast
 Stefan Danailov - Danton Tahov
 Velko Kanev - Petar Petkin
 Anton Radichev - Andrey Granitski
 Ventzislav Valchev - Rusev
 Vasil Stoychev - Kostadinov
 Ivan Grigorov - Sotirov
 Maria Stefanova - Michona
 Aneta Sotirova - Stefcheto
 Maria Statoulova - Petkina
 Iskra Radeva - Tahova
 Valentina Borisova - Peeva
 Marina Kostova - Veneta
 Maya Zurkova - ex-Tahova
 Ivan Yanchev - the father in law
 Yasen Milevin - the son of Tahov
 Bozhidar Iskrenov - the elevator technician

See also
List of Bulgarian films

External links
 

1980s Bulgarian-language films
1985 films
1985 comedy films
Bulgarian comedy films
Films directed by Petar B. Vasilev